John Coprario (c. 1570 – 1626), also known as Giovanni Coprario or Coperario, was an English composer and viol player.

According to later commentators such as John Playford and Roger North, he changed his name from either Cowper or Cooper to Coperario in the early 17th century (at least as early as February 1601), though he himself spelled his name "John Coprario". Anthony Wood said he changed his name after an extended visit to Italy, and though he is documented as having visited the Low Countries in 1603, evidence confirming his presence in Italy has not been found.  From 1622 he served and may have taught the Prince of Wales, for whom he continued to work upon his succession as Charles I. His longtime patron was Edward Seymour, Earl of Hertford, for whom, according to Thomas Fuller's The History of the Worthies of England (1662), he taught William Lawes.

Among Coprario's works are fantasias, suites and other works for viols and violins, and two collections of songs, Funeral Teares (1606) and Songs of Mourning: Bewailing the Untimely Death of Prince Henry (1613). He also penned a treatise on composition, Rules how to Compose.

According to Ernst Meyer, Coprario was a Londoner who Italianized his name as Italian music and musicians became more fashionable, and spent much of his life as a musician in the royal court.

Ninety-six fantasias for three up to six voices, most of them in two Oxford and Royal College of Music collections, were known to exist by Coprario (as of 1946). Meyer also notes that most of Coprario's five- and six-part fantasias are mainly transcriptions, or imitations, of his madrigals, but that his fantasias for three or four instrumental parts are, formally especially, independently interesting.

References

External links

 https://web.archive.org/web/20180106212629/http://www.geocities.jp/lyrischesuite/Coprario.htm

English classical composers
English viol players
English Baroque composers
Renaissance composers
1570s births
1626 deaths
People of the Elizabethan era
English music theorists
16th-century English composers
16th-century English musicians
17th-century English musicians
17th-century English composers
17th-century classical composers
English male classical composers